Glycera may refer to:

Glycera (genus), genus of bloodworm
Glycera (courtesan), popular name for Hellenistic courtesans